Vadim Karlenovich Abramov is a former Uzbekistani football player of Armenian-Russian descent. Abramov was born in 1953 in Baku, Azerbaijan. He served as Uzbekistan's head coach from 2010 to 2012. He has become the second Armenian, after Yuriy Sarkisyan, to lead the Uzbek team, and also the second Armenian to lead a team into an international tournament.

Managing career

In 2003-2005 Abramov worked as head coach of Traktor Tashkent. The club reached final of Uzbek Cup in 2004 and year later ranked at 4th place in League. In 2006, he became coach of Lokomotiv Tashkent. The club finished 2009 season at 6th place. On 6 April 2010, Abramov was appointed as head coach of Uzbekistan national team, replacing Mirjalol Kasymov.

He was the coach of the Uzbekistan team at the 2011 AFC Asian Cup.

In their first game of the 2011 Asian Cup they defeated Qatar 2-0.
They went on to reach the quarter finals where they faced Jordan. After beating Jordan 2-1, Uzbekistan qualified for the semi finals where they lost to Australia. They eventually finished in fourth place after losing to South Korea in the third place playoff. On 4 June 2012, after a 1-0 loss to Iran at home during 2014 FIFA World Cup qualification, he resigned from his job.

On 28 November 2013 Abramov was named new head coach of Astana. Two weeks later agreement with club was canceled.

On 13 February 2014 he was appointed as new head coach of Lokomotiv Tashkent after his predecessor Khakim Fuzaylov was fired from his post. Abramov moved back to his former club after serving in Lokomotiv in 2008-2010. He worked in Lokomotiv more than year. Lokomotiv leading by Abramov won Uzbek Cup in 2014 and the club finished again runner-up. On 8 March 2015 Lokomotiv won Uzbekistan Super Cup, beating current champion Pakhtakor by 4-0. On 17 October 2015 he was fired from his post after several unsatisfactory results in league matches.

On 24 September 2019, Abramov was named manager of Uzbekistan national football team for the second time.

Personal life
His son was Armenia U-17 and Navbahor Namangan football player, Karlen Abramov. He died in a car accident, at just 21 years old.

Managerial statistics

Honours

Manager

Traktor
Uzbek Cup runner-up: 2004

Uzbekistan
AFC Asian Cup 4th place: 2011

Lokomotiv
Uzbek League runners-up (1): 2014
Uzbek Cup (1): 2014
Uzbekistan Super Cup (1): 2015

Individual
Uzbekistan Football Coach of the Year: 2011

References

External links
Football Database Profile
Uzbekistan national team managers

1953 births
Living people
Uzbekistani people of Russian descent
Uzbekistani people of Azerbaijani descent
Uzbekistani people of Armenian descent
Azerbaijani people of Armenian descent
Footballers from Baku
Soviet Armenians 
Soviet footballers
Uzbekistani footballers
Association football midfielders
SC Tavriya Simferopol players
FC Chayka Sevastopol players
Soviet football managers
Uzbekistani football managers
Pakhtakor Tashkent FK managers
FC Neftchi Farg'ona managers
Traktor Tashkent managers
PFC Lokomotiv Tashkent managers
Uzbekistan national football team managers
FC Astana managers
FC Bunyodkor managers
Uzbekistan Super League managers
2011 AFC Asian Cup managers
Uzbekistani expatriate football managers
Uzbekistani expatriate sportspeople in Kazakhstan
Expatriate football managers in Kazakhstan